Alcay (possibly from Quechua for to cut halfway through, to interrupt; to fail, Hispanicized spelling Alcay) is a  mountain in the north of the Huayhuash mountain range in the Andes of Peru. It is located in the  Huánuco Region, Lauricocha Province, Queropalca District. Alcay lies northwest of a lake named Carhuacocha, east of Mituraju and southeast of Rondoy. The little lake northeast of the mountain is Alcaycocha.

See also 
 Ninacocha
 Carhuacocha

References

Mountains of Peru
Mountains of Huánuco Region